Marcia L. Washington is an American politician from the state of Nevada. A Democrat, Washington represented the 4th district of the Nevada Senate, covering parts of Las Vegas, North Las Vegas, and Sunrise Manor, from 2019 until 2020.

Career
Prior to serving in the State Senate, Washington worked in the state and Clark County government, including as Clark County fire inspector, in the Clark County School District, and on the Nevada Board of Education.

Electoral history
In 2019, following the resignation of 4th district incumbent Kelvin Atkinson over corruption charges, Washington was chosen by the Clark County Commission from a field of 11 candidates to fill his seat, beating out more prominent contenders such as Assemblywoman Dina Neal. Washington had been endorsed by the Senate Democratic Caucus and the politically powerful Culinary Local 226.

Upon her appointment, Washington pledged to serve only as a caretaker, and did not file for re-election in 2020.

Personal life
Washington lives in Las Vegas with her husband David, with whom she has four children.

References

Living people
Democratic Party Nevada state senators
21st-century American politicians
Women state legislators in Nevada
21st-century American women politicians
1953 births